Belkis Cuza Malé (born 1942) is a Cuban-American writer, journalist, and painter, best known for her poetry.

Biography
She studied literature at the University of Santiago de Cuba beginning in December 1964. After marrying her first husband, she moved to Havana and finished her schooling at the University of Havana. In 1965 she gave birth to her daughter María Josefina, "and soon after came the divorce."

It was at her first alma mater that she debuted as a poet, with the book El viento en la pared. This was published thanks to her professor, the Mexican Eraclio Cepeda, for the University of Santiago de Cuba's Department of Public Extension in 1962. That year she competed in Cuba's main literary event with Tiempos de sol, which received honorable mention for the Casa de las Américas Prize. She met the poet Heberto Padilla, who also received honorable mention in that competition (with El justo tiempo humano) and would become her partner five years later. The following year she repeated her success, obtaining another mention for the award with Cartas a Ana Frank.

She began to work as a journalist at Hoy in 1965, and afterward moved to the newspaper Granma, from which, she says, she was fired in 1967.

In 1966 she again saw Padilla, when he returned from Czechoslovakia, and at the end of the next year they began living together. They were officially married on 25 January 1971.

Although Cuza Malé worked for Granma, she says she never had "any revolutionary enthusiasm". About this time she says:

Cuza Malé was arrested on 20 March 1971, following the recital given by Padilla in the Union of Writers, where he had read Provocaciones. Both were accused of "counterrevolutionary activities" against the government, but she was only held incommunicado for three days in the barracks of Villa Marista (Padilla was held for 37) and participated in the self-denouncement meeting held at the Union of Writers when her husband was released.

Her book Juego de damas was the third which received mention for the Casa de las Américas Prize (in 1968), an excerpt of which appeared in the anthology 8 poetas. In 1971, the already-published collection of poems from the Union of Writers and Artists of Cuba was destroyed due to the arrest of Cuza Malé and Padilla. It would be reissued 31 years later by Término Editorial of Cincinnati.

Cuza Malé's parents had abandoned Cuba in 1966 and lived in Miami. This allowed her, in 1979, to escape to the United States with Ernesto, the son she had had with Padilla, who at the time was six years old. The next year, thanks to international pressure and particularly the efforts of Senator Edward Kennedy, her husband was able to follow.

Exile
At first, Cuza Malé stayed with her parents, but she later had to move, as the Cuban government warned that her husband would not be allowed to emigrate if she did not leave Miami. She opted to go to Elizabeth, New Jersey, to the house of her childhood friend Elkes Arjona. There she worked as an administrator in a Cuban clothing store, and later in other places, illegally, as she had tourist status and could not seek asylum for fear of reprisals that Cuba might take against Padilla and her daughter. (María Josefina was 13 years old when Cuza Malé left the island, and 18 years passed before she was able to see her again.)

In Princeton in 1982 – in collaboration with Padilla, who had initially opposed the idea – Cuza Malé founded Linden Lane Magazine, specializing in art and literature of Cubans in exile. In 1986, she founded the Cuban cultural center and art gallery La Casa Azul in Fort Worth, Texas, where she had moved. After the death of Padilla in 2000, this institution took his name in tribute to his memory. Cuza Malé had separated from the poet in 1995.

About religion and her mystical side, she explained in 2008:

Cuza Malé resides in Fort Worth, Tx.

In addition to poetry, Cuza Malé has dabbled in fiction and has at least three unpublished novels.

Awards and recognition
Honorable Mention, 1962 Casa de las Américas Prize for Tiempos de sol
Honorable Mention, 1963 Casa de las Américas Prize for Cartas a Ana Frank
Honorable Mention, 1968 Casa de las Américas Prize for Juego de damas
Keys of Miami for cultural work, 2011

Works

Poetry
 El viento en la pared, Department of Public Extension of the University of Santiago de Cuba, 1962
 Los alucinados, 1962
 Tiempos de sol, Ediciones El Puente, Havana, 1963
 Cartas a Ana Frank, 1966
 Juego de damas, Union of Writers and Artists of Cuba, Havana, 1971 (destroyed); Término Editorial, Cincinnati, 2002
 Woman on the Front Lines, bilingual edition; translated: Pamela Carmell; selections of Juego de damas and El patio de mi casa (this last was the provisional title of the poetry collection that was eventually named La otra mejilla); Unicorn Press, Greensboro, 1987
 La otra mejilla, Ediciones ZV Lunáticas, Paris, 2007
 Los poemas de la mujer de Lot, Linden Lane Press, 2011

Other
 El clavel y la rosa: biografía de Juana Borrero, Cultura Hispánica, Madrid, 1984
 En busca de Selena, prose, 1997
 Elvis. The Unquiet Grave or the True Story of Jon Burrows, testimonial, E. Press, 1994
 Lagarto, lagarto. novel, Linden Lane Press, 2013
 Ermita. Jazmín y melaza, album/testimonial. Linden Lane Press, 2013
 Heberto Padilla. Puerta de Golpe, anthology compiled by Cuza Malé, Linden Lane Press, 2013

See also
 Cuban American literature
 List of Cuban-American writers

References

External links
 Official blog 
 Elvis / John Smith blog
 La Casa Azul blog 
 "Linden Lane Magazine, tres décadas del empeño de Belkis Cuza Malé" 

1942 births
20th-century Cuban poets
Cuban expatriates in the United States
Cuban women poets
Living people
People from Guantánamo
University of Havana alumni
20th-century Cuban women writers